Broken China is the second and final solo album by the Pink Floyd keyboardist Richard Wright.

Overview 
The album is a four-part concept album based on Wright's then-wife Mildred's battle with depression, and is very much like a classic Pink Floyd concept album in its structure and overall feel. Two songs, "Reaching for the Rail" and "Breakthrough" feature Sinéad O'Connor on lead vocals, with Wright singing elsewhere. The album was recorded in Wright's studio in France. Broken China was only Wright's second solo record after 1978's Wet Dream and the last before his death in September 2008.

The Pink Floyd guitarist David Gilmour played on "Breakthrough". However, the approach for the song was changed later on, and Gilmour's performance was not used on the finished release. On the DVD David Gilmour in Concert, a guest appearance is made by Wright, who sings "Breakthrough" accompanied by Gilmour and his band.

The packaging has artwork by Pink Floyd's regular designer, Storm Thorgerson, and Peter Curzon.

Track listing

Personnel 
 Richard Wright – keyboards, vocals, programming
 Anthony Moore – computer programming & arrangements, 'telephone vocal' (2)
 Sinéad O'Connor – lead vocals (12, 16)
 Tim Renwick – guitars
 Dominic Miller – guitars
 Steven Bolton – guitars
 Pino Palladino – bass guitar
 Manu Katché – drums, percussion
 Sian Bell – cello
 Kate St. John – oboe, cor anglais
 Maz Palladino – backing vocals

Design 
 Storm Thorgerson, Peter Curzon - sleeve design
 Tony May - photography
 Jason Reddy -  computer
 Julien Mils, Finlay Cowan - artwork

References

External links 
 
 Broken China Interview, by M. Blake, August 1996

1996 albums
Albums with cover art by Storm Thorgerson
Concept albums
EMI Records albums
Albums produced by Richard Wright (musician)
Albums produced by Laurie Latham
Richard Wright (musician) albums
Albums recorded at RAK Studios
Albums recorded in a home studio